Spike is the 12th studio album by the British rock singer and songwriter Elvis Costello, and his first since My Aim Is True without the Attractions, released on vinyl and compact disc as Warner Brothers 25848. It was his first album for the label and peaked at No. 5 on the UK Albums Chart. It also reached No. 32 on the Billboard 200 thanks to the single and his most notable American hit, "Veronica", which reached No. 19 on the Billboard Hot 100 and No. 1 on the US Modern Rock chart. In The Village Voices annual Pazz & Jop critics poll for the year's best albums, Spike finished at No. 7.

Content
In 1987, Costello began writing with Paul McCartney for the latter's Flowers in the Dirt album. They composed a dozen songs together, which showed up on multiple albums by McCartney and Costello. Two of those songs appear on this album, "Pads, Paws and Claws" and the hit single "Veronica".

As his first album for a new label, in his own words Costello had the budget of "a small independent movie", and having in mind the blueprint for five different albums, decided to make all of them. He brought back his foil from King of America, T Bone Burnett, to facilitate the sessions and produce the album. Studio time was booked in four different locations: Ocean Way in Hollywood; Southland Studios in New Orleans; Windmill Lane Studios in Dublin; and AIR Studios in London. Four different groups of musicians were assembled in each location. Writing credits on the album are given to both Elvis Costello and Declan MacManus, Costello's birth name.

The single "Veronica" peaked at No. 31 on the UK singles chart and at No. 19 in America, his best showing ever on the Billboard Hot 100. It also reached No.1 on the US Modern Rock chart. "This Town" was also released as a single but missed both of the main singles chart in both nations. An extended play single was also released for "Baby Plays Around", peaking at No. 65 in the UK.

The second track, "Let Him Dangle", is a protest song opposing capital punishment, recounting the 1953 conviction and execution of Derek Bentley.

The seventh track, "Tramp the Dirt Down", is a fiery lament, depicting Costello's anger at the Thatcher government and its effect on Britain's society. In the song, Costello expresses his desire to live long enough to see Margaret Thatcher die and vows, "I'll stand on your grave and tramp the dirt down." "I wish I'd written 'Tramp the Dirt Down'," said singer Natalie Merchant. The song reached No. 79 on the iTunes chart following Thatcher's death in April 2013. In addition, he played this song at Glastonbury 2013 having previously performed it there on the Pyramid Stage in 1987.

Lyrics are given in the booklet for the eighth track, "Stalin Malone", but the album recording is an instrumental and does not include vocals. A version with a recitation of the lyrics as poetry appears on the 2001 bonus disc.

Release history
The album was released initially on compact disc in 1989. As part of the Rhino Records reissue campaign for Costello's back catalogue from Demon/Columbia and Warners, it was re-released in 2001 with 17 additional tracks on a bonus disc. The bonus disc included three tracks with Nick Lowe on bass and Attractions drummer Pete Thomas for use as b-sides, recorded at Wessex Sound Studios after the Spike mixing sessions.

Track listing
All tracks written by Elvis Costello, except where noted; track timings taken from Rhino 2001 reissue.

 "...This Town..." – 4:32
 "Let Him Dangle" – 4:45
 "Deep Dark Truthful Mirror" – 4:07
 "Veronica" (Costello, Paul McCartney) – 3:09
 "God's Comic" – 5:31
 "Chewing Gum" – 3:47
 "Tramp the Dirt Down" – 5:41
 "Stalin Malone" – 4:09
 "Satellite" – 5:45
 "Pads, Paws and Claws" (Costello, McCartney) – 2:56
 "Baby Plays Around" (Costello, Cait O'Riordan) – 2:47
 "Miss Macbeth" – 4:23
 "Any King's Shilling" – 6:07
 "Coal-Train Robberies" – 3:18
 "Last Boat Leaving" – 3:31

2001 bonus disc
Tracks 1–12 are solo demo recordings.

 "Miss Macbeth" – 3:51
 "...This Town..." – 3:50
 "Deep Dark Truthful Mirror" – 4:07
 "Coal Train Robberies" – 2:52
 "Satellite" – 4:50
 "Pads, Paws and Claws" (Costello, McCartney) – 2:08
 "Let Him Dangle" – 3:39
 "Veronica" (Costello, McCartney) – 3:03 
 B-side to "So Like Candy" single
 "Tramp the Dirt Down" – 5:19
 "Baby Plays Around" (Costello, O'Riordan) – 2:42
 "Put Your Big Toe in the Milk of Human Kindness" – 3:17
 "Last Boat Leaving" – 3:29
 "The Ugly Things" (Nick Lowe) – 2:56 
 B-side to "This Town" single
 "You're No Good" (Clint Ballard, Jr.) – 2:22 
 B-side to "Veronica" single
 "Point of No Return" (Gerry Goffin, Carole King) – 2:34 
 B-side to "Baby Plays Around" single
 "The Room Nobody Lives In" (John Sebastian) – 4:46 
 B-side to twelve-inch and CD single of "Veronica"
 "Stalin Malone" – 3:12 version with recitation

Personnel
 Elvis Costello – vocals, acoustic guitar, bass guitar, electric guitar, mandolin, piano, bells, acoustic bass guitar, organ, melodica
 T Bone Burnett – acoustic guitar, bass, national steel guitar
 Cait O'Riordan – maracas, bells

Dublin
 Derek Bell – Irish harp, hammered dulcimer
 Frankie Gavin – fiddle
 Dónal Lunny – acoustic guitar, bouzouki, electric bouzouki
 Davy Spillane – pipe, uilleann pipes, Low whistle
 Steve Wickham – fiddle
 Christy Moore – bodhran
 Pete Thomas – drums

New Orleans
 Lionel Batiste – bass drum
 Gregory Davis – trumpet
 Willie Green – drums
 Kevin Harris – tenor saxophone
 Charles Joseph – trombone
 Kirk Joseph – sousaphone
 Roger Lewis – baritone saxophone, soprano saxophone
 Jenell Marshall – snare drum
 Allen Toussaint – grand piano
 Efrem Towns – trumpet

Hollywood
 Michael Blair – glockenspiel, marimba, tambourine, xylophone, bells, timpani, vibraphone, Chinese drums, Oldsmobile hubcap, Parade drum, anvil, whiplash, crash-box, temple bells, snare drum, "magic table", metal pipe, "Martian dog bark"
 Ralph Forbes – electric drums, drum programming
 Mitchell Froom – organ, harmonium, electric piano, chamberlin, Indian harmonium
 Roger McGuinn – twelve-string guitar, Rickenbacker bass guitar
 Jim Keltner – tom-toms, snare drum, Chinese cymbal
 Jerry Marotta – drums
 Buell Neidlinger – cello, double bass
 Marc Ribot – banjo, electric guitar, Spanish guitar, sounds
 Jerry Scheff – electric bass, double bass, fuzz bass
 Benmont Tench – piano, clavinet, spinet, Vox Continental
 Tom "T Bone" Wolk – accordion, bass

London
 Chrissie Hynde – harmony vocals
 Nick Lowe – bass
 Paul McCartney – Hofner bass guitar, Rickenbacker bass guitar
 Pete Thomas – drums

Charts

Weekly charts

Year-end charts

Singles

Certifications

 
}

References

External links
 

Elvis Costello albums
1989 albums
Albums produced by Elvis Costello
Albums produced by T Bone Burnett
Baroque pop albums
Rhino Records albums
Warner Records albums